Xinzhen Subdistrict is a subdistrict located on northeastern Fangshan District, Beijing, China. It borders Qinglonghu Town to the north, and Yanchun Town to the south. As of 2020, the subdistrict had 10,681 inhabitants living inside its borders. 

This region was developed for research in atomic energy starting in 1950. The name Xinzhen was given by Guo Moruo during his visit of a local research facility in 1958.

History

Administrative Divisions 
In 2021, Xinzhen Subdistrict administered 2 residential communities under it. They are listed in the table below:

See also 
 List of township-level divisions of Beijing

References 

Fangshan District
Subdistricts of Beijing